Pedro Luís António, (January 13, 1921 – July 25, 2014) was an Angolan prelate of the Roman Catholic Church.

António was born in Caconda, Angola and ordained a priest on July 20, 1952. António was appointed Bishop of the Diocese of Kwito-Bié on June 15, 1979 and ordained bishop on July 29, 1979. António served The Diocese of Kwito-Bié until his retirement on January 15, 1997.

External links
Catholic-Hierarchy

20th-century Roman Catholic bishops in Angola
People from Huíla Province
1921 births
2014 deaths
Roman Catholic bishops of Kwito-Bié